The 2006–07 Czech 1.liga season was the 14th season of the Czech 1.liga, the second level of ice hockey in the Czech Republic. 14 teams participated in the league, and HC Slovan Usti nad Labem won the championship.

Regular season

Playoffs

Quarterfinals  
 HC Hradec Králové – HC Sareza Ostrava 4:2 (3:1, 5:2, 2:4, 2:7, 3:1, 6:4)
 HC Slovan Ústí nad Labem – HC Dukla Jihlava 4:0 (3:2 P, 5:2, 5:2, 3:0)
 BK Mladá Boleslav – SK Horácká Slavia Třebíč 4:1 (7:0, 4:2, 1:2 P, 4:1, 6:0)
 KLH Chomutov – HC Kometa Brno 4:0 (4:2, 3:1, 2:1, 4:2)

Semifinals
 HC Hradec Králové – KLH Chomutov 1:3 (7:3, 1:2 SN, 2:3, 1:5)
 HC Slovan Ústí nad Labem – BK Mladá Boleslav 3:0 (4:3, 4:1, 6:4)

Final 
 HC Slovan Ústí nad Labem – KLH Chomutov 3:2 (4:0, 2:3, 2:3 P, 3:2 P, 5:1)

External links
 Season on hockeyarchives.info

2
Czech
Czech 1. Liga seasons